Franz von Bocholt was a German engraver, working between 1458  and 1480.

Life
According to the 16th-century writer Matthias Quad, in his book Teutscher Nation Herrlichkeit ("The Excellency of the German Nation"), Bocholt invented the process of engraving on copper, although by the late 18th century Joseph Strutt could  describe this theory  as "with the greatest justice, generally exploded". Strutt also disputed Quad's idea that Bocholt's works were drawn from nature, describing them as "in general, stiff, laboured copies, from the works of Israel van Mecheln and Martin Schoon".

According to Quad, Bocholt was a shepherd at Mons in Hainault, but he is more likely to have come from Bocholt, a small town in the bishopric of Münster. His prints, fifty-five, are mostly copies after those of Martin Schongauer and Von Meckenen, although  he also engraved a few plates from his own designs. His works are generally signed with the initials  "F. v. B.".

Works
His engravings include:

Copies from after Schongauer
St. Anthony carried into the air by demons (original).
St. James reading.
St. Michael and the Dragon.

Copies after Israel von Meckenen
The Judgment of Solomon.
The Annunciation.
The Virgin and Child; in an arch.

Subjects from his own designs
A Friar struggling with a Girl, who defends herself with her distaff.
Samson strangling the Lion.
Two men Quarrelling.
St. George and the Dragon.

References

Sources
 

German engravers
15th-century German people
People from Bocholt, Germany
Year of birth unknown
Year of death unknown